The Butterfly World Tour was the third concert tour by American singer-songwriter Mariah Carey. The tour promoted Carey's album Butterfly (1997), and included songs from several of her previous albums. The tour visited Asia, Australia and the United States, with rehearsals taking place in December 1997. Starting on January 11, 1998, the tour spanned five shows in Asia, six in Australia, and one in Hawaii, US. Throughout the tour, Carey varied hairstyles and outfits, as well as song selections.

The tour was recorded on camera, resulting in a concert video released in VHS format, titled Around the World. The video featured live performances of Carey at different worldwide venues including New York, Japan, Hawaii and Brisbane. Other scenes are included in the video such as a conversation between Carey and Brenda K. Starr prior to her performance of "I Still Believe". Prior to the performances in Australia, a scene of Carey swimming with dolphins is shown. Additionally, Olivia Newton-John makes a cameo appearance during their joint performance of Newton-John's song, "Hopelessly Devoted to You". The video was commercially successful, being certified platinum in the United States by the Recording Industry Association of America (RIAA) and gold in Brazil by the Associação Brasileira dos Produtores de Discos (ABPD).

Background 
Since her debut in 1990, Carey had not journeyed on a large or extensive tour. In fact, she had not embarked on a tour until her third studio effort, Music Box (1993), when she performed six arena shows in the United States during the Music Box Tour. The opening night of the tour received scathing reviews, mostly aimed at Carey's deemed "obvious" stage-fright and failure to make a connection with the crowd. Succeeding nights were more favorably reviewed, with critics raving about Carey's vocals. Jon Pareles of The New York Times wrote regarding Carey's live vocals, "Beyond any doubt, Ms. Carey's voice is no studio concoction. Her range extends from a rich, husky alto to dog-whistle high notes; she can linger over sensual turns, growl with playful confidence, syncopate like a scat singer." However, after the strong media attention, Carey did not visit the US on her succeeding Daydream World Tour in 1996, visiting only Europe and Asia. The tour in contrast, received critical acclaim from critics and fans alike, as well as breaking ticket sale records. During 1997, after the commercially and critically successful release of Butterfly, Carey had not planned to tour once again, due to the long travel times and strain on her voice. However, due to overwhelming demand by fans, Carey agreed to perform in Asia once again, only extending the tour to Taiwan and Australia, as well as one last show in the United States. Rehearsals for the show began shortly after Christmas 1997, extending for a period of two weeks.

Originally, the Butterfly Tour was to have a leg in North America. Due to Mariah's project of filming the movie Double-O Soul with Chris Tucker in early 1998, the North American leg was cancelled. However, Double-O Soul ended up not seeing the light of day.

Concert synopsis 
The show began with Carey standing on a small elevated centerpiece on stage, surrounded by several long draped curtains. Carey featured three background vocalists throughout the tour, Trey Lorenz, Melodie Daniels and Kelly Price. As the introduction began with "Emotions", each of the curtains were slowly draped, revealing Carey atop the platform, dressed in a beige mini-dress and matching sheer blouse and stiletto heels. As she began performing "Emotions", the platform was lowered so Carey could access the other sections of the stage throughout the song's performance.  After an intimate performance with dimmed lights for "The Roof (Back in Time)", Carey was joined on-stage by a Peruvian guitar player, who played the Latin-inspired guitar melodies during her performance of "My All". Afterwards, Carey sang "Close My Eyes", the only sitting performance of the show. During the song, several male backup dancers performed slow and ample dance routines behind Carey on a higher level of the stage.

For the second part of the show, Carey had the second costume change of the evening, donning a long sequined black gown and semi-teased hair. For the performance of "Dreamlover", Carey was joined by three female back-up dancers, who mimicked her light dance routines during the song. The next song on the set-list was "Hero", which featured Carey alone on-stage, without any vocal back-up. After the song's performance, Carey was joined on-stage by Lorenz, who performed "I'll Be There" alongside her. Next came "Make It Happen", a song which accompanied yet another wardrobe change for Carey. She donned a short mini-skirt, alongside a sleeveless white blouse and loose golden curls. On-stage, Carey was joined by a full church choir, all dressed in long black garments. After the song's recital, Carey performed "One Sweet Day", alongside a previously recorded video of Boyz II Men during their live performance of the song with Carey at Madison Square Garden in 1995.

After completing the song, Carey changed to a pair of leg-hugging blue jeans and a tank top. Her next performance was the "Fantasy" remix, featuring Ol' Dirty Bastard on a large projection screen behind the stage, as Carey performed light chair dance-routines alongside several male dancers. The performance featured the most intricate choreography Carey performed on the tour. After a low-key performance of "Babydoll", or "Whenever You Call" in other countries, Carey was once again joined by several male dancers, as she sang "Honey", while re-enacting the music video during a small skit. Carey once again changed to a beige ensemble similar to her first outfit before performing her debut single, "Vision of Love". The final song on the tour was "Butterfly", which featured large stills of butterflies and flowers projected onto the large screen behind Carey. She donned a long brown sequined gown for the performance, being joined on stage once again by her trio of back-up singers. During the shows in Japan, Carey performed her holiday classic "All I Want for Christmas Is You", alongside various male and female dancers on stage who performed light dance routines alongside Carey. During the song, Carey donned a Santa suit and matching hat, while being carried on a large stage prop by the dancers.

Reception 
The show at Hawaii's 50,000 capacity Aloha Stadium made her one of the few acts in the stadium's history to sell out the entire venue. Aside from its commercial success, fans and critics raved about the show's visuals, as well as Carey's vocal delivery.

Broadcasts and recordings 
During the tour, several bits and performances were filmed and later edited into a VHS and DVD entitled Around the World. The VHS featured performances from Tokyo Dome, Aloha Stadium as well as few other skits and scenes that were later compiled into the video. The film first begins with performances in Hawaii, where the song's recitals are cut into halves, excluding the second verses and bridge to shorten the bulk length of the video. Afterwards, Carey's performance of "My All" is shown in inter-cut scenes from Japan and Taipei. After the conclusion of the song, scenes of Carey conversing with Brenda K. Starr are shown, which eventually lead to a tribute to her at a small and intimate New York club, where Carey performs "I Still Believe". Soon after, Carey's performance in Japan with Lorenz for "I'll Be There" is shown, leading to scenes of Carey swimming with dolphins in Australia. the next title on the video is Carey's live rendition of "Hopelessly Devoted To You", where she is joined by Olivia Newton-John on stage in Melbourne. A scene of a fans gathering outside of a New York City studio is shown, following a performance of "Honey," and "Hero" at Aloha Stadium. The VHS was a commercial success, being certified platinum by the Recording Industry Association of America (RIAA), denoting shipments of over 100,000 units. The video was also certified gold in Brazil by the Associação Brasileira dos Produtores de Discos (ABPD).

Set list 

 "Looking In"/"Butterfly" (Introduction)
 "Emotions"
 "The Roof (Back in Time)"
 "My All"
 "Close My Eyes" (With extended outro)
 "Daydream Interlude" (Fantasy Sweet Dub Mix) (Performed by background dancers)
 "Dreamlover"
 "I'll Be There" (With Trey Lorenz)
 "Make You Happy" (Performed by Trey Lorenz)
 "Make It Happen"
 "One Sweet Day"
 "Ain't Nobody" (Band introductions)
 "Fantasy" (Bad Boy Remix)
 "Breakdown" 
 "Put Your Hands Where My Eyes Could See" (Performed by background dancers)
 "Honey" (With elements of "Bad Boy Remix")
 "Vision of Love"
 "Butterfly"
 "Without You"
 "Hero"
 "Butterfly Reprise" (Outro)

Notes:

 "Babydoll" was performed in Tokyo and the second Sydney show.
 "Without You" was not performed in Tokyo and Honolulu.
 "All I Want for Christmas Is You" was performed as an encore in Tokyo.
 "Whenever You Call" was performed in Perth, Brisbane, Taipei, and Honolulu.
 "Breakdown" was not performed the first night in Tokyo.
 Olivia Newton-John joined Carey during the performance of "Hopelessly Devoted to You" on the Melbourne show.

Shows

Cancelled shows

Personnel 
Randy Jackson – musical director, bass
Eric Daniels – keyboards
Andrew Sherman – keyboards
Vernon Black – guitar
Gregory "Gigi" Gonoway – drums
Marquinho Brasil – percussion
Melonie Daniels – background vocals
Deborah Cooper – background vocals
Mary Ann Tatum – background vocals
Sherry McGhee – background vocals
Nicol Richards – background vocals
Trey Lorenz – special guest vocalist

References

Works cited 

Mariah Carey concert tours
1998 concert tours